Barhara Kothi railway station is a small railway station on Banmankhi–Bihariganj branch line of Barauni–Katihar section. It is located in Purnia district, Bihar, India. Its code is BAKT. It serves Barhara Kothi village. The station consists of one platform.

Services 

As of January 2020, there is one daily DEMU train connecting Barhara Kothi with :

Gauge conversion 

In 2017, Banmankhi–Bihariganj branch line which initially was laid as metre-gauge railway, was closed for gauge conversion to  broad gauge.

There is a project to extend the line after Bihariganj up to Kursela.

References 

Railway stations in Purnia district
Samastipur railway division